Mauricio de Maio is a Brazilian plastic surgeon who works with injectable fillers and botulinum toxin.  He is the co-author of three textbooks on plastic surgery.

Career
De Maio studied medicine at the Medical School of the University of São Paulo. After his residency in Plastic Surgery and clinical practice since 1996, he specialized in non-surgical procedures

De Maio developed a technique for using injectable fillers and botulinum toxin (Botox) for cosmetic procedures that he calls "the MD Codes". He has taught his technique in MD Codes Institute.

He is a member of the Brazilian Society of Aesthetics and Reconstructive Plastic Surgery since 1997 and active member of the International Society of Aesthetic Plastic Surgery (ISAPS) since 2004

Textbooks
 Injectable Fillers in Aesthetic Medicine (Maio, Mauricio; Rzany, Berthold) - Springer-Verlag Berlin Heidelberg, 2006 and 2nd edition (2014). Published in English, Spanish, Portuguese and Korean.  
 The Male Patient in Aesthetic Medicine (Maio, Mauricio; Rzany, Berthold). Published in English. Publisher Springer-Verlag Berlin Heidleberg, 2009.  
 Botulinum Toxin in Aesthetic Medicine (Maio, Mauricio; Rzany, Berthold). Publisher - Springer-Verlag Berlin Heidelberg, 2007. Published in English, Spanish, Portuguese, Korean and Japanese.

References

External links 
 

Brazilian plastic surgeons
Year of birth missing (living people)
Living people
University of São Paulo alumni